The Royal College of Veterinary Surgeons  (RCVS) is the regulatory body for veterinary surgeons in the United Kingdom, established in 1844 by royal charter. It is responsible for monitoring the educational, ethical and clinical standards of the veterinary profession. Anyone wishing to practice as a vet in the United Kingdom must be registered with the RCVS.

Role
To safeguard the health and welfare of animals committed to veterinary care through the regulation of the educational, ethical and clinical standards of the veterinary profession, thereby protecting the interests of those dependent on animals and assuring public health.
To act as an impartial source of informed opinion on animal health and welfare issues and their interaction with human health.

Anyone who wishes to practice as a vet in the United Kingdom must first register with the RCVS. Eligibility for registration is based either on having a recognised qualification or by passing the RCVS statutory membership examination. After registration, the vet is entitled to use the letters MRCVS (Member of the Royal College of Veterinary Surgeons) or FRCVS (Fellow of the Royal College of Veterinary Surgeons) after their name.

During the ceremony of admission to the RCVS, members make a declaration:

The Royal Charter
The 1844 charter regulates particular aspects of the college's management of its affairs and gives it the power to award fellowships, diplomas and certificates to veterinary surgeons, veterinary nurses, and others engaged in "veterinary science and its auxiliary sciences".

The statutory duties of the RCVS are laid out in the Veterinary Surgeons Act 1966.

RCVS Practice Standards Scheme
The regulatory role of the RCVS has always meant that members of the public could rest assured that their individual vet is properly qualified and fit to practise, and now the same assurance can apply to practice premises. The RCVS Practice Standards Scheme is a voluntary initiative to accredit veterinary practices in the UK. Through setting standards and carrying out regular inspections, the Scheme aims to promote and maintain the highest standards of veterinary care.

RCVS Accredited practices are able to display the RCVS accredited practice logo, which indicates that the practice has undergone a rigorous, independent inspection and various minimum standards have been met.

The Disciplinary Committee of the Royal College of Veterinary Surgeons 
The Disciplinary Committee of the Royal College of Veterinary Surgeons hears charges against veterinary surgeons accused of serious professional misconduct or being unfit to practice because of a criminal conviction.

Appeals from decisions of the Disciplinary Committee are heard by the Judicial Committee of the Privy Council.

Officials
In order to carry out its statutory duties a council of 33 members governs the RCVS and meets eight times a year. The President, vice-presidents (two), and Treasurer are elected by Council and together with the Chief Executive and Head of Legal Services/Registrar, form a team of officers who have the main responsibility for running the RCVS.

President: Melissa Donald
Vice President: Kate Richards 
Vice President: Sue Patterson
Treasurer: Prof Susan Dawson 
Chief Executive: Ms Lizzie Lockett
Registrar: Eleanor Ferguson

Publications
Colours and Markings of Horses (revised 2005 and distributed by Weatherbys Bookshop)
Directory of Veterinary Practices (annual, published in October)
RCVS Annual Report (annual, published in June)
RCVS Guide to Professional Conduct (revised 2006)
RCVS News (newsletter – March/June/November)
Register of Members (annual, published in November)
Veterinary Nurses List (annual, published in March)

Past-Presidents

 William Hunting (1894–1895)
 Orlando Charnock Bradley (1920–1922)
 John Share Jones (1928–1929)
 Thomas Dalling (1949–51)
 Olga Uvarov (1976–1977)
 Judy MacArthur Clark (1992-1993)
 Alasdair Steele-Bodger (1972–1973)
 Richard Halliwell (2003–2004)
 Alexander Trees, Baron Trees (2009–2010)

See also
 Veterinary medicine in the United Kingdom
 Royal Veterinary College

References

External links

Veterinary Surgeons Act 1966

Veterinary medicine in the United Kingdom
1844 establishments in the United Kingdom
Health in the City of Westminster
Organisations based in the United Kingdom with royal patronage
Organisations based in the City of Westminster
Organizations established in 1844
Veterinary Surgeons
Veterinary medicine-related professional associations